G. cristatus may refer to:

Germanodactylus cristatus
Gobius cristatus